Social choice function may refer to:
 Social choice functions in mechanism design
 Social choice functions in social choice theory, also known as voting rules